The Grantsville School and Meetinghouse, located at 90 N. Cooley Ln. in Grantsville, Utah, United States, dates from 1861.  It has also been known as the Grantsville City Hall and the Old Adobe Schoolhouse, and it is now the Donner-Reed Museum. It was listed on the National Register of Historic Places in 1995.

Description
It served as a school for 30 years starting in 1861;  it was used as Grantsville's city hall during 1894–1917.  It employed locally made adobe bricks and use of Greek Revival styling.  Its NRHP nomination suggests that since it has been minimally altered since its original construction in 1861, "it is one of the oldest, and perhaps best preserved, schoolhouses in Utah."

Donner-Reed Museum
The Donner-Reed Museum is operated by the Sons of Utah Pioneers in the former schoolhouse.  The museum features items abandoned by the Donner Party along the trail in their quest to reach California in 1846, including wagon parts, equipment, horse shoes and other items.  The museum is open by appointment.

See also

 National Register of Historic Places listings in Tooele County, Utah

References

External links

 Donner-Reed Museum

School buildings on the National Register of Historic Places in Utah
Greek Revival architecture in Utah
School buildings completed in 1861
Buildings and structures in Tooele County, Utah
Education in Tooele County, Utah
Schools in Utah
Museums in Tooele County, Utah
History museums in Utah
1861 establishments in Utah Territory
National Register of Historic Places in Tooele County, Utah